XHTL-FM may refer to:

XHTL-FM (San Luis Potosí), Mix 99.3 FM
XHTL-FM (Veracruz), Radio Ola 91.5 FM and 1390 AM